The objective of the  International Sustainable Energy Organization for Renewable Energy and Energy Efficiency (ISEO) with headquarters in Geneva is to accelerate and enlarge the worldwide contribution of clean, sustainable energy to economic and equitable social development. Gustav R. Grob founded ISEO for the United Nations in  2002.

Sectors
Architecture - Willi Weber
Bioenergy - R Sims, M Sumenjak
Clean fuels - Armin Reller
Co-generation / Heat Pumps - S. Minett
Economy - Darja Piciga
Education / Training - J. Corominas
Efficiency - Rolf Wahnschafft
Energy policy - G. R. Grob
Financing - Arik Schweiger
Geothermal energy - Ritesh Arya
Hydropower - Dogan Altinbilek
Legal - Adrian Bradbrook
Muscle energy / Food & Feed - Steivan Defilla
Ocean energy - Les Duckers
Solar energy (PV) - Wilhelm Durisch
Solar thermal energy - Andreas Luzzi
Statistics & Forecasting - G.R. Grob 
Transport - Rolf Schatzmann
Wild energy - Maen Kaedan

External links
http://www.uniseo.org/ Home page

International organisations based in Belgium
Sustainable energy